Ioan Sabo (16 August 1836 – 2 May 1911) was a Romanian Greek Catholic hierarch. He was bishop of the Romanian Catholic Eparchy of Gherla, Armenopoli, Szamos-Ujvár from 1879 to 1911.

Born in Istrău, today in Romania (then Esztró, Kingdom of Hungary, Austrian Empire) in 1836, he was ordained a priest on 4 September 1859. He was confirmed the Bishop by the Holy See on 15 May 1879. He was consecrated to the Episcopate on 3 August 1879. The principal consecrator was Bishop Mihail Pavel.

He died in Gherla, today in Romania (then Szamosújvár, Austria-Hungary) on 2 May 1911.

References 

1836 births
1911 deaths
19th-century Eastern Catholic bishops
20th-century Eastern Catholic bishops
Romanian Greek-Catholic bishops